The Council of Pisa, was convened by Pope Innocent II in May 1135. An extraordinary number of prelates, archbishops, bishops, monks, and abbots attended the council, including a large number of Italian clergy. The council addressed simony, schismatic clerics, heresy, as well as donations to the Templar Order. Pisa would be the third council Innocent would convene to address issues within the Catholic Church.

Background
In February 1130, following the death of Pope Honorius II, Innocent II had been hastily elected pope by six cardinals led by papal chancellor Haimeric. This was contested by the Roman Pierleoni family that chose Anacletus II. Without any Roman support Innocent fled to France, where he gained the support of Louis VI of France, Bernard of Clairvaux, and Peter the Venerable. While in France he held two Councils, Clermont(November 1130) and Rheims(October 1131). In June 1133, Innocent returned to Rome to quickly crown Lothair of Saxony emperor, but following Lothair's hurried exit from Rome he fled to Pisa.

The council was initially planned for November 1135, but Bernard who attended the diet of Bamberg(March 1135), learned that Emperor Lothair was planning an invasion of Italy. Reinforced by this news, Innocent chose May 1135 for the synod.

Council
One hundred twenty-six archbishops and bishops, and numerous abbots from Italy, Germany, France, England, Spain and Hungary attended. Bernard used this council to rally support for Innocent II in northern Italy.

Excommunication and Condemnation
The first order of business was the excommunication of antipope Anacletus II and his supporters, including Roger II of Sicily. This was followed by the removal of the bishops of Halberstadt, Liege, Valence, Arezzo, Acera, and Moderna, and the archbishop of Milan all on the charges of simony or giving support to Anacletus II. All schismatic ordinations were condemned.

Henry the Monk was brought before the council and condemned on the charge of maintaining heretical views. He was ordered to cease his preaching and return to a monastery.

Templars
The Templar Order met the clergy of north-west Italy for the first time at Pisa. Bernard of Clairvaux called on the assembled clergy to allow the Knights Templar commanderies in their own jurisdictions. Innocent set the precedent by giving a mark of gold each year to the Templar order. This donation was matched by the bishops who all gave a silver mark apiece.

Clerical marriage
All marriages involving clerics, monks, and cloistered nuns were annulled. It was agreed by all participants of the council that such unions were not regarded as marriage. This judgment established celibacy as a major theme in Innocentian politics.

Regulate religious orders
Restricted the placement of adolescents into religious orders, unless they show prudence and merit for that type of life.

Aftermath
Held during the pinnacle of the papal schism, the Council of Pisa has been described as the end of the reform papacy by H.W. Klewitz.

Antipope Anacletus II died on 25 January 1138, ending the schism within the Catholic Church. Gregorio de Conti, who was elected Antipope Victor IV in March 1138, quickly abdicated by May 1138 and recognized Innocent II as head of the Catholic church.

Innocent returned to Rome and at the Second Council of the Lateran held on 29 March 1139, he issued the papal bull, Omne datum optimum. This gave the Templar Order an official sanction as defenders of the Catholic Church. In the following years, thanks to the persuasive effort by Bernard, the Templars founded commanderies at Piacenza and Reggio Emilia.

Notes

References

Sources

1135 in Europe
12th century in the Papal States
12th-century Catholic Church councils